Rodney E. Hood is a member of the National Credit Union Administration board and was the eleventh chairman of the board from 2019 to 2021. Hood was the first African-American to lead a federal banking agency.

Career 

A native of Charlotte, North Carolina, Hood obtained a Bachelor of Science in business, communications, and political science from the University of North Carolina at Chapel Hill.

Prior to his public service career, Hood worked for Bank of America as a Community Reinvestment Act officer. He later held positions at North Carolina Mutual Life Insurance Company as marketing director and group sales manager. Hood also served as national director of the Emerging Markets Group for Wells Fargo Home Mortgage and served on the board of the Wells Fargo Housing Foundation.

From 2003 until 2005, Hood served as associate administrator of the Rural Housing Service at the U.S. Department of Agriculture.

Hood was appointed to the NCUA Board by former President George W. Bush and served from November 2005 until August 2009. He was appointed Vice Chairman and served as the NCUA's representative on the Board of Directors of NeighborWorks America.

Hood next worked as a corporate responsibility manager for JPMorgan Chase, managing national partnerships with non-profit organizations, financial regulators, and community stakeholders to promote financial inclusion in underserved and ethnic minority communities.

Hood was nominated to the board of the National Credit Union Administration (NCUA) on January 19, 2019, by President Donald Trump. The U.S. Senate confirmed his appointment on March 14, 2019, and he took the oath of office on April 8, 2019.

Hood was designated NCUA board chairman upon his swearing-in on April 8, 2019. He served as chairman until January 20, 2021, when President Joe Biden appointed fellow member Todd Harper to the position. As chairman, Hood served as a voting member of the Financial Stability Oversight Council. He also represented the NCUA on the Financial and Banking Information Infrastructure Committee and as Vice Chairman of the Federal Financial Institutions Examination Council.

References 

1967 births
Living people
North Carolina Republicans
George W. Bush administration personnel
Trump administration personnel
University of North Carolina at Chapel Hill alumni